Gargamella is a genus of sea slugs, dorid nudibranchs, shell-less marine gastropod molluscs in the family Discodorididae.

Species 
Species in the genus Gargamella include:
 Gargamella blokoverdensis Moro & Ortea, 2015
 Gargamella bovina Garavoy, Valdes & Gosliner, 1999
 Gargamella gravastella Garavoy, Valdes & Gosliner, 1999
 Gargamella immaculata Bergh, 1894. Synonym: Gargamella latior Odhner, 1926
 Gargamella lemchei (Ev. Marcus, 1976)
 Gargamella perezi (Llera & Ortea, 1982)
 Gargamella sp. 1, ocellate dorid
 Gargamella wareni Valdes & Gosliner, 2001

Synonyms
 Gargamella latior Odhner, 1926: synonym of Gargamella immaculata Bergh, 1894
 Gargamella novozealandica Eliot, 1907 is a synonym of Jorunna pantherina

References

Discodorididae
Gastropod genera